Rowan Marc Joffé (born 1973) is a British screenwriter and director. He is the son of director Roland Joffé and actress Jane Lapotaire, and half-brother of actress Nathalie Lunghi. Joffé began writing plays in university and was eventually awarded a Cameron Mackintosh bursary.

Joffé's first two screenwriting projects (Last Resort and Gas Attack) both won the Best New British Feature Award at the Edinburgh International Film Festival. His 2003 television drama Turkish Delight, about a bored housewife who starts a new job belly dancing, won the Royal television Society's Best Drama Award (Midland). He directed The Shooting of Thomas Hurndall which won the Best Single Drama Award at the 2009 BAFTA TV Awards.

In 2009, Joffé directed his first feature film, his own adaptation of the novel Brighton Rock which relocates the action to the 1960s.

In 2010, Joffé wrote a screenplay based on the novel A Very Private Gentleman by Martin Booth. It was directed by Anton Corbijn with George Clooney in the leading role, and was eventually released under the title The American (film).

Joffé's next project as director was an adaptation of the S.J. Watson novel Before I Go to Sleep, with Nicole Kidman in the lead. Joffé also wrote the screenplay adaptation.

In 2017, Tin Star, for which Joffé serves as creator and producer, debuted on Sky Atlantic. The series, starring Tim Roth, was picked up by Amazon streaming service for distribution in the United States.

Filmography
Feature films

TV movies

TV series

References

External links

1973 births
Living people
British male screenwriters
British television writers
British television directors
Film directors from London
Alumni of the University of Oxford
Date of birth missing (living people)
Writers from London
British male television writers
People educated at Sussex House School